The Statute Law Revision and Civil Procedure Act 1883 (46 & 47 Vict c 49) is an Act of the Parliament of the United Kingdom. The Bill for this Act was the Statute Law Revision and Civil Procedure Bill.

Section 209 of the Supreme Court of Judicature (Consolidation) Act 1925 provided that if and so far as any enactment repealed by this Act applied, or might have been applied by Order in Council, to the Court of the County Palatine of Lancaster, or to any inferior court of civil jurisdiction, that enactment was to be construed as if it were contained in a local and personal Act specially relating to that court, and was to have effect accordingly.

Section 187 of the County Courts Act 1888 provided that any reference to an inferior court in this Act was to be construed as referring to courts under that Act as well as to any other inferior court.

As to the effect of this Act on Lord Cairns' Act, see Leeds Industrial Co-operative Society v Slack.

Preamble
The preamble was repealed by the Statute Law Revision Act 1898.

As to the preamble, see Hanak v Green.

Section 2
This section provided that the Act did not extend to Scotland or Ireland, and that it came into operation on 24 October 1883.

The words from "It shall" to the end of the section were repealed by the Statute Law Revision Act 1898.

Section 4
This section was repealed by the Statute Law Revision Act 1898.

Section 5
This section was repealed by the Statute Law Revision Act 1898.

Section 6
As to this section, see Buckley v Hull Docks.

Sections 6(a) and (b) were repealed by the Statute Law Revision Act 1898.

Schedule
The Schedule, except the entries as to 5 & 6 Vict c 69 and 21 & 22 Vict c 27, was repealed by the Statute Law Revision Act 1898.

See also
Statute Law Revision Act

References
Halsbury's Statutes,
The Public General Statutes passed in the forty-sixth and forty-seventh years of the reign of Her Majesty Queen Victoria, 1883. Queen's Printer. East Harding Street, London. 1883. Pages 225 to 227.
John Mounteney Lely. "Statute Law Revision and Civil Procedure Act, 1883". The Statutes of Practical Utility. (Chitty's Statutes). Fifth Edition. Sweet and Maxwell. Stevens and Sons. London. 1895. Volume 6. Title "Judicature". Pages 100 to 103.
William Paterson (ed). "Statute Law Revision and Civil Procedure Act, 1883". The Practical Statutes of the Session 1883. Horace Cox. Wellington Street, Strand, London. 1883. Pages 193 to 198.
Thomas Snow, Charles Burney and Francis A Stringer. The Annual Practice 1909. Sweet and Maxwell. Stevens and Sons. London. 1909. Volume 1. Pages ccxciii, 7, 52, 159, 198, 459, 463, 469, 515, 520, 526, 528, 540, 617, 642, 647, 650 to 653, 668, 669, 709, 712 and 803. Volume 2. Pages 530, 560, 588, 587 and 1005.
Snow, Winstanley and Walton, assisted by Clarkson. "Statute Law Revision and Civil Procedure Act, 1883". The Annual Practice. 1884-5. William Maxwell & Son. Henry Sweet. London. 1884. Pages 114 to 117. See also page 42.
Charles Burney, Montague Johnstone Muir Mackenzie and Sir Charles Arnold White. "Statute Law Revision and Civil Procedure Act, 1883". Wilson's Practice of the Supreme Court of Judicature. Seventh Edition. Stevens and Sons Limited. Chancery Lane, London. 1888. Pages 125 to 128. See also pages 1, 15, 25, 36, 38, 39, 55, 56, 59, 62, 63, 65, 68, 74 to 76, 80 to 82, 86, 88, 89, 91, 94, 113, 122, 128*, 130, 153, 154, 277, 284, 376, 434 and 515.
"How the Statute Book is Incumbered" (1890) 88 The Law Times 359 (22 March 1890)
(1923) 67 Solicitors Journal 514 (5 May)
"The Law and the Lawyers" (1885) 78 The Law Times 258
"Notes of the Month" (1883) 5 Law Students' Journal 173
Arthur Paul Stone (ed). The Law Reports. Digest of Cases. 1892. Volume 3. col 6794.
Ephraim Arnold Jacob. An Analytical Digest of the Law and Practice of the Courts of Common Law, Divorce, Probate, Admiralty and Bankruptcy, and of the High Court of Justice and the Court of Appeal of England. Digest Pub Co. Broadway, New York. 1886. Volume 11 (Supplement 1883 to 1886). Column 17833.
Jenks, Geldart, Holdsworth, Lee and Miles. A Digest of English Civil Law. Second Edition. Butterworth & Co. London. 1921. Volume 1. Pages 377 and 389.
Powell. Roscoe's Digest of the Law of Evidence. Sixteenth Edition. 1891. Volume 1. Pages 9, 228, 310, 716, 732, 880, 990, 991, 998, 999.

External links

United Kingdom Acts of Parliament 1883